Lake Louise may refer to:

Canada 
Lake Louise (Alberta), a lake in Alberta
Lake Louise, Alberta, a hamlet which takes its name from the lake
Chateau Lake Louise, hotel in Alberta, one of Canada's Grand Railway Resorts
Lake Louise Ski Resort, a ski resort in Lake Louise, Alberta

Lake Louise (Estrie), a lake in Weedon, Chaudière-Appalaches, Quebec

United Kingdom
Lake Louise (Skibo Castle), a small artificial lake in Scotland

United States
Lake Louise, Alaska, a census-designated place, and a large lake in Matanuska-Susitna Borough, Alaska
Lake Louise (Douglas County, Minnesota)
Lake Louise (Pennsylvania), in Luzerne County
Lake Louise State Park, a park in Mower County, Minnesota
Thumb Lake, a lake in Northern Michigan